Malik Turner (born January 30, 1996) is an American football wide receiver for the Indianapolis Colts of the National Football League (NFL). He played college football at Illinois, and was originally signed by the Seattle Seahawks in 2018 as an undrafted free agent. He also played for the Dallas Cowboys.

Early years
Turner attended Sacred Heart-Griffin High School, where he practiced football and basketball. He received All-Central State Eight honors as a sophomore and junior.

As a senior, he tallied 69 receptions for 1,378 yards (19.9-yard avg.) and 22 touchdowns, while contributing to a 14-0 record and an IHSA Class 5A state championship. He received Central State Eight Conference Player of the Year honors.

College career
Turner accepted a football scholarship from the University of Illinois. As a true freshman, he appeared in 13 games with 5 starts at wide receiver. He registered 25 receptions for 256 yards and one touchdown. He had 6 receptions for 84 yards against Louisiana Tech University.

As a sophomore, he appeared in 12 games with 10 starts. He posted 39 receptions for 510 yards (second on the team) and 3 receiving touchdowns (tied for the team lead). He had 11 catches for 126 yards against the University of Minnesota.

As a junior, he started 11 games and missed one contest with an injury. He led the team with 48 receptions, 712 yards and 6 receiving touchdowns. He had 11 receptions and 164 yards against Northwestern University. He made 9 receptions for 107 yards against Western Michigan University. He was named honorable-mention All-Big Ten.

As a senior, he started 9 out of 10 games. He missed 2 games with an injury. He collected 31 receptions (tied for the team lead), 326 receiving yards (second on the team) and 2 touchdowns.

He finished his college career with 143 receptions (ninth in school history), 1,804 receiving yards (ninth in school history) and 10 receiving touchdowns.

Professional career

Seattle Seahawks
After an unsuccessful tryout at a minicamp with the Green Bay Packers, Turner was signed by the Seattle Seahawks as an undrafted free agent on July 29, 2018. He was cut by the Seahawks at the end of training camp but was re-signed by the team to their practice squad on September 10, 2018. Turner was promoted to the Seahawks' active roster on October 31, 2018. Turner made his NFL debut on November 4, 2018 in a 17–25 loss against the Los Angeles Chargers. Turner caught his first career pass, a 19-yard reception from Russell Wilson, in the Seahawks' 30–27 win over the Carolina Panthers on November 25, 2018. He was waived on December 22, 2018 and re-signed to the practice squad and was subsequently promoted back to the active roster on January 1, 2019. In his rookie season, Turner caught two passes for 20 yards in six games played.

In a Monday Night Football game on November 11, 2019 against the San Francisco 49ers, after an injury to Tyler Lockett, Turner caught two passes for 35 yards, both in overtime. Turner caught a 33-yard pass from Wilson for his first career touchdown on November 24, 2019 in a 17–9 win over the Philadelphia Eagles.
	
During the 2019 Divisional round game against the Green Bay Packers, Turner dropped a critical catch while wide open.

On April 14, 2020, after originally receiving an exclusive-rights free agent tender, the Seahawks rescinded the tender, making Turner a free agent.

Green Bay Packers
On August 12, 2020, Turner signed with the Green Bay Packers. He was waived on September 5, 2020.

Dallas Cowboys
On September 6, 2020, Turner was claimed off waivers by the Dallas Cowboys, to play on the special teams units, helping to offset the loss of wide receiver Ventell Bryant to a knee injury. He played in the first 4 games of the season, before being declared inactive in the next 12 contests. He appeared in 6 games and registered 2 special teams tackles.

On March 19, 2021, he was re-signed a one-year contract with the Cowboys. He was having problems with a turf toe in training camp and suffered a foot injury in the last preseason game against the Jacksonville Jaguars. On September 2, 2021, he was placed on injured reserve to start the season. He was activated on October 2, 2021. He was a backup and his most notable performance came in Week 9 against the Denver Broncos, where he almost made NFL history, by just missing a blocked punt in the third quarter (it didn't count because the Cowboys touched the ball after it crossed the line of scrimmage), that would've made him the first player ever to record 2 touchdown receptions and a blocked punt in a single-game. In Week 16 against the Washington Football Team, he had 3 receptions (including a 61-yard catch-and-run) for 82 yards and a touchdown, after playing just 13 offensive snaps. He finished the season with 12 receptions for 149 yards, 3 touchdowns and one special teams tackle. He wasn't re-signed after the season.

San Francisco 49ers
On April 11, 2022, the San Francisco 49ers signed Turner to a one-year deal. He was waived on August 30, 2022 and signed to the practice squad the next day. He was released on November 1.

Las Vegas Raiders
On November 4, 2022, the Las Vegas Raiders signed Turner to their practice squad. He was released on December 20.

Houston Texans
On December 23, 2022, Turner was signed to the Houston Texans practice squad.

Indianapolis Colts
On February 24, 2023, Turner signed with the Indianapolis Colts.

NFL career statistics

Regular season

Postseason

References

External links

Illinois Fighting Illini bio

1996 births
Living people
Sportspeople from Springfield, Illinois
Players of American football from Illinois
American football wide receivers
Illinois Fighting Illini football players
Seattle Seahawks players
Green Bay Packers players
Dallas Cowboys players
San Francisco 49ers players
Las Vegas Raiders players
Houston Texans players
Indianapolis Colts players